Henry Bowmaker Yorston (9 June 1929 – 17 May 1992) was a Scottish professional football player, who played for Aberdeen, and represented Scotland once. Yorston made over 200 league appearances for Aberdeen, scoring 98 goals. His uncle Benny was also a professional footballer who, like his nephew, played for Aberdeen and the Scottish national side. 

Yorston retired from professional football at the age of 28 after being offered a lucrative fish market porter job in Aberdeen. In 1972, he won £175,000 on the football pools. He died from brain cancer on 17 May 1992, at the age of 62.

Career statistics

Club

International

References

External links

1929 births
1992 deaths
Association football inside forwards
Scottish footballers
Scotland international footballers
Aberdeen F.C. players
Scottish Football League players
Scottish Football League representative players
Buckie Thistle F.C. players